Turku Hansda Lapsa Hemram Mahavidyalay, established in 2006, is a government affiliated college located at Mallarpur in the Birbhum district of West Bengal. It is affiliated to University of Burdwan offering undergraduate degrees in Arts, Sciences. Turku Hansda Lapsa Hemram Mahavidyalay was awarded 'B' grade by National Assessment and Accreditation Council (NAAC) in 2016.

Accreditation
The college is recognized by the University Grants Commission (UGC).

See also

References

External links
 Turku Hansda Lapsa Hemram Mahavidyalay

Universities and colleges in Birbhum district
Colleges affiliated to University of Burdwan
Educational institutions established in 2006
2006 establishments in West Bengal